Sunstroke at the Beach Resort is a 1973 Danish comedy film directed by Klaus Pagh and starring Daimi.

Cast
 Daimi as Vibeke / Viggo
 Lisbet Lundquist as Mona Miller
 Lise-Lotte Norup as Eva Linde
 Klaus Pagh as Teodor / Teddy Winther
 Dirch Passer as Dr. Grå
 Ulf Pilgaard as Portieren

References

External links

1973 films
1973 comedy films
Danish comedy films
1970s Danish-language films
Films directed by Klaus Pagh